Daniel Lima de Castro (born 18 June 1999), commonly known as Dani Bolt or simply Daniel, is a Brazilian professional footballer who plays as an right-back for Juventude, on loan from Athletico Paranaense.

Club career
Bolt joined the academy of Fluminense in 2019. In mid-2020, Bolt was cut from the Fluminense first team after failing to renew his contract with the club. After the contract situation was resolved, he made a total of five appearances for Fluminense, before agreeing to terminate his contract following the 2021 season.

He moved to Athletico Paranaense in early 2022. He was loaned to Vitória in April 2022, alongside teammate Léo Gomes. For the 2023 season, he was loaned to Juventude.

Style of play
Known for his speed, he is nicknamed Dani Bolt after Jamaican sprinter Usain Bolt.

Career statistics

Club

References

1999 births
Living people
Footballers from Rio de Janeiro (city)
Brazilian footballers
Association football defenders
Association football fullbacks
Campeonato Brasileiro Série A players
Campeonato Brasileiro Série C players
Fluminense FC players
Club Athletico Paranaense players
Esporte Clube Vitória players
Esporte Clube Juventude players